Bacon is a cured meat prepared from a pig.

Bacon may also refer to:

People
 Francis Bacon (1561–1626), a philosopher, scientist, politician, jurist, librarian
 Roger Bacon (c 1210 – c 1292), a medieval English philosopher and Franciscan friar
 Bacon (name), a comprehensive list of people with family name "Bacon"

Schools
 Bacon Academy, Connecticut
 Bacon College (1837–1851), a forerunner of Transylvania University, a private university in Lexington, Kentucky
 Bacon's College, London, a secondary school and sixth-form college previously known as Bacon Free School

Places

United States 
 Bacon Hills, a mountain range in California
 Bacon Island, California
 Bacons, Delaware, an unincorporated community
 Bacon County, Georgia
 Bacon, Indiana, an unincorporated community
 Bacon, Missouri, an unincorporated community
 Bacon Township, Vernon County, Missouri
 Bacon, Ohio, an unincorporated community
 Bacon Creek, near Mammoth Cave in Kentucky
 Bacon Creek, Washington
 Bacon Glacier, Alaska
 Bacon Peak, a mountain in Washington

Elsewhere 
 Bacon, Ivory Coast, a village in Lagunes District, Ivory Coast
 Bacon Lake, British Columbia, Canada
 Bacon River, Nunavut, Canada

Music and books
 "Bacon" (song), by Nick Jonas
 Bacon (album), a 2014 album by Igor & the Red Elvises
 Bacon: A Love Story, a 2009 non-fiction book by Heather Lauer

Other uses
 Bacon baronets, three titles in the Baronetage of England, one extinct
 2940 Bacon, an asteroid
 Bacon's, a chain of department stores
 Bacon's cipher, a method of steganographic message encoding devised by Francis Bacon
 Bacon Hotel, Whitehall, Arkansas, on the National Register of Historic Places
OnePlus One, an Android smartphone released in 2014 (codename "bacon")
 Bacon (god), a Gaulish Celtic god
Bacon's Rebellion, a rebellion in British North America
 BaCon (programming language), a BASIC to C programming language converter
 Macon Bacon, a collegiate summer baseball team

See also
 Bacn, e-mail that has been subscribed to but which the recipient may not want to read for a long period of time
 Battlefield Airborne Communications Node (BACN)